Legend of the Naga Pearls (Chinese: 鲛珠传) is a 2017 Chinese fantasy adventure film directed by Yang Lei, starring Wang Talu, Zhang Tianai and Sheng Guansen. It is the first film to be set in the fictional world of Novoland. The film was released on August 11, 2017 in China.

Synopsis
Once upon a time, in the city of Uranopolis, lived the Winged Tribe, a race capable of flying. But after losing a battle to humans, they gradually lost their ability to fly. Xue Lie, a royal descendant from the Winged Tribe, begins a search for the magical Naga Pearls in order to destroy the Human Tribe and avenge the death of his people.
When Ni the thief, Gali the human prince, and Hei Yu the constable accidentally lay hands on a mysterious box containing the Naga Pearls, they find themselves hunted down by Xue Lie. After they have lost the pearls to Xue Lie eventually, they decide to team up and rush back to Uranopolis to thwart his evil plans.

Cast 
Wang Talu as Ni Kongkong
Zhang Tianai as Hei Yu
Sheng Guansen as Gali 
Simon Yam as Xue Lie
Jiang Luxia as He Ying
Wang Xun 
Zhao Jian
Xing Yu 
Hu Bing
Sui He

Critical reception 
The Hollywood Reporter called the film "diverting and attractive, but not novel enough to attract viewers", and South China Morning Post called the film "enjoyable but generic". However, it received praise for its production design and "relentlessly earnest desire to please".

References

External links
 

Chinese fantasy adventure films
2010s Mandarin-language films
2017 films
Novoland
2010s fantasy adventure films
Films based on Chinese novels